Mosafer Zehi (also Romanized as Mosāfer Zehī; also known as Mosāfer Zā’ī and Mosāferzī) is a village in Polan Rural District, Polan District, Chabahar County, Sistan and Baluchestan Province, Iran. At the 2006 census, its population was 418, in 76 families.

References 

Populated places in Chabahar County